Scott The Woz (stylized in start case) is a gaming comedy review web series created by American YouTuber Scott Wozniak. The series, starring Wozniak, covers topics related to video games and gaming history. Episodes are written and directed by Wozniak, with recurring characters played by friends. The main channel currently has 1.8 million subscribers on YouTube, with a second channel, Scott's Stash, focusing on behind-the-scenes content. Compilations of episodes were syndicated on the 2021–2022 revival of the TV network G4.

Premise

Scott The Woz is a video game review web-series, with a focus on discussion and retrospective of video games topics such as consoles, accessories, history and subculture.

The series has an emphasis on skit-based humor with a set of recurring characters, and episodes occasionally deviate from the series' focus on video games.

Cast and characters
The Scott The Woz series has several recurring characters:

 Scott (played by Scott Wozniak, the show's creator) is the main protagonist of the series.
 Jeb Jab (played by Sam Essig) is a friend of Scott's and avid fan of Gex.
 Rex Mohs (played by Eric Turney) is a short-tempered friend of Scott's. He is a former school dance chaperone and employee of Waste Chasers. Rex has displayed a large hatred of sex throughout the series.
 Wendy's Employee and Target Employee (played by Dominic Mattero) are a pair of brothers who work at Wendy's and Target, respectively. Wendy's Employee died during Halloween of 2020.
 Dr. Jerry Attricks (played by Justin Womble) is a therapist and former news anchor reporter. He owns The Think Barrel, where he conducts therapy.
 Terry Lesler (played by Joe Robertson) is a vegan and a member of the organization Vegans Anonymous Gathering.
 Steel Wool (played by Jarred Wise) is a police officer. At a dinner party, he murdered several characters, though most of them recovered. He was later sued and sentenced to death, though later resurrected.
 Kay Swiss (played by Jeffrey Pohlman-Beshuk) is a bank teller, economist, and employee of Bankruptcy Patrol.
 Chet Shaft (played by Will Kanwischer) is a former manager of fictional game store "Games On A Shelf" and ghost who shows up in various episodes to give advice to Scott. He is resurrected along with Steel Wool.

History

Background
Wozniak had made videos on YouTube as a child based on his own creations such as short stories, comics and drawings. Initially ceasing to make videos in 2012 due to low viewership, Wozniak returned to content creation in his senior year of high school to make a comedic video titled "The Internet and You" with his friends.

Conception
After experimenting with other skit ideas, Wozniak worked on the first episode of Scott the Woz in December 2016. Focused on his opinions of the Nintendo Switch, the video fused his interest in video games with his skit-based comedy. The first episode of the web series was uploaded on YouTube in January 2017. The series would initially maintain a consistent schedule of weekly videos; Wozniak announced in May 2022 that the web series would no longer be released weekly. Wozniak maintains a secondary channel, Scott's Stash, for behind-the-scenes and extra content. In 2023, Wozniak confirmed that his friends are now assisting with production of the show in a more official capacity.

YouTube episodes

Television broadcast
At TooManyGames 2021, Wozniak announced that Scott the Woz would air on a then-unannounced TV channel. It was later announced that it would air on the gaming channel G4, and the show began airing on December 7, 2021. According to Wozniak, the YouTube videos were compiled in a random order, and edited down for television format, in a format reminiscent of on-air compilations of classic animation.

On March 7, 2022, G4 announced the G4 Select Channel on the free internet television service Pluto TV. The channel features series from the television channel, including Scott the Woz.

In October 2022, it was announced that G4 would be ceasing all operations, ending television syndication of Scott the Woz.

Television episodes

Fundraising
Wozniak, together with gaming merchandise website Pixel Empire, frequently offer limited-edition merchandise based on the show during "Merchandise for Charity Bonanza" events, with all proceeds going to charities Critical Care Comics and Children's Miracle Network Hospitals. As of 2023, the fundraisers have raised over $1,000,000 for the two charities. The event occurs yearly, with the exception of 2023, which was cancelled in favor of indefinitely extending the 2022 event. The events feature items such as T-shirts and posters, as well as unique products every year, including products such as VHS releases of The Internet and You and a behind-the-scenes artbook.

On November 26, 2021, Wozniak announced Monopoly: Scott The Woz Edition, an officially licensed version of the Monopoly board game based on the Scott the Woz series. The product, produced in limited quantities, was sold via the Pixel Empire website as part of a charity fundraiser. In December 2022, he announced Clue: Scott the Woz Edition, a version of Clue based on the show, also to be released on the Pixel Empire website with all profits going to charity. Wozniak also announced a line of 51 collectible trading cards, manufactured by USAopoly. Each card contains a QR code that, when scanned, leads to one of 51 timed exclusive videos corresponding to that card.

Reception
Scott the Woz has received generally positive reception, with praise directed towards the humor and quality. In an article listing the ten best episodes of the series, Screen Rant described Scott the Woz as a fusion of "video game reviews, retrospectives, and skits," stating that "some of the best episodes of the series are the ones that combine all three, especially when his zany, off-kilter, outlandish humor is on display." Luke Schmid of PC Games compared the series positively to Angry Video Game Nerd, but critiqued its repetition, stating that, "...some statements are repeated too often, points are raised and then repeated three sentences later, sometimes almost word for word." PopCulture.com's John Connor Coulston said that Wozniak's videos have a "distinct, homemade style".

See also
 List of programs broadcast by G4

Notes

References

Citations

External links
 

Comedy YouTubers
Gaming YouTubers
2010s YouTube series
2017 web series debuts
2020s YouTube series
American comedy web series
American critics
Video game critics
YouTube critics and reviewers
English-language television shows
Television shows filmed in Ohio
Television shows set in Ohio